Martina Navratilova was the defending champion but lost in the semifinals to Gabriela Sabatini.

Sabatini won in the final 3–6, 6–3, 7–5 against Steffi Graf.

Seeds
A champion seed is indicated in bold text while text in italics indicates the round in which that seed was eliminated. The top eight seeds received a bye to the second round.

  Steffi Graf (final)
  Martina Navratilova (semifinals)
  Gabriela Sabatini (champion)
  Natasha Zvereva (second round)
  Lori McNeil (second round)
  Arantxa Sánchez (semifinals)
  Larisa Savchenko (second round)
  Hana Mandlíková (quarterfinals)
  Sandra Cecchini (second round)
  Bettina Fulco (second round)
  Judith Wiesner (quarterfinals)
  Terry Phelps (second round)
  Isabel Cueto (second round)
  Leila Meskhi (third round)
 n/a
 n/a

Draw

Finals

Top half

Section 1

Section 2

Bottom half

Section 3

Section 4

External links
 ITF tournament edition details

Amelia Island Championships
1989 WTA Tour